Canadian Pacific Railway no. 283 was a 4-4-0 locomotive built by the Hinkley Locomotive Works in 1883.  The engine did not receive a class designation like most of the railway's locomotives received, and little is known about its service life, though it can be assumed that the engine was in general passenger and freight service throughout its career.   The engine is notable for having pulled the funeral train of former Canadian Prime Minister John A. Macdonald from Ottawa to Kingston, Ontario on June 10, 1891.  It was scrapped in 1897.

References

0283
History of rail transport in Canada
Railway locomotives introduced in 1883
4-4-0 locomotives
Individual locomotives of Canada
Scrapped locomotives
Standard gauge locomotives of Canada